The following is an alphabetically ordered list of notable Asian Pacific American members of the United States Democratic Party, past and present.

A

 Daniel Akaka, former Senator from Hawaii
 George Ariyoshi, former Governor of Hawaii

B
 Kumar P. Barve, Majority Leader of the Maryland House of Delegates
 Ami Bera, Congressman from California
 Madeleine Bordallo, Congressional Delegate from Guam

C
 Ben Cayetano, former Governor of Hawaii
 Hansen Clarke, Congressman from Minnesota
 Judy Chu, Congresswoman from California
 Steven Chu, former United States Secretary of Energy

D
 Tammy Duckworth, Congresswoman from Illinois
 Mervyn M. Dymally, former Congressman from California

E
 March Fong Eu, former Secretary of State of California

F
 Eni Faleomavaega, former Congressional Delegate from American Samoa

G
 Tulsi Gabbard, Congresswoman from Hawaii

H
 
 Colleen Hanabusa, Congresswoman from Hawaii
 Kamala Harris, 49th Vice President of the United States; former U.S. Senator from California and 32nd Attorney General of California
 Mazie Hirono, Senator from Hawaii
 Mike Honda, Congressman from California

I

 Daniel Inouye, former U.S. Senator from Hawaii

L

 Ed Lee, Mayor of San Francisco
 Ted Lieu, Congressman from California
 John Liu, former New York City Comptroller
 Gary Locke, former Governor of Washington and former United States Secretary of Commerce

M

 Bob Matsui, former Congressman from California
 Doris Matsui, Congresswoman from California
 Spark Matsunaga, former Senator from Hawaii
 Grace Meng, Congresswoman from New York
 Norman Mineta, former Congressman and former United States Secretary of Transportation
 Patsy Mink, former Congresswoman from Hawaii
 Stephanie Murphy, Congresswoman from Florida

Q
 Jean Quan, Mayor of Oakland, California

S
 Gregorio Sablan, Congressional Delegate from the Northern Mariana Islands
 Dalip Singh Saund, former Congressman from California
 Robert C. Scott, Congressman from Virginia
 Eric Shinseki, former United States Secretary of Veterans Affairs
 Fofó Iosefa Fiti Sunia, former Congressional Delegate from American Samoa
 Kim Singh,former Chair of Asia Pacific Caucus of CDP. California Democratic Party

T
 Mark Takai, former Congressman from Hawaii
 Mark Takano, Congressman from California
 Jill Tokuda, Congresswoman from Hawaii

U
 Robert A. Underwood, former Congressional Delegate from Guam

W
 Antonio Borja Won Pat, former Delegate from Guam 
 Shien Biau Woo, former Lieutenant Governor of Delaware
 David Wu, former Congressman from Oregon

See also

Congressional Asian Pacific American Caucus
List of Asian Americans
Asian Pacific American
List of Asian Pacific Americans in the United States Congress
Asian Americans in government and politics

References

 
Lists of American politicians
Democratic Party (United States)-related lists